Dubai Press Club (Arabic: نادي دبي للصحافة) is a part of the Government of Dubai Media Office founded in November 1999 by Mohammed bin Rashid Al Maktoum and is based in Dubai Media City in Dubai, United Arab Emirates. It launched the Arab Media Forum and the Arab Journalism Award.

Awards and honors
 Media Creativity Awards by the Arab Thought Foundation (December 2010)

See also
Arab Journalism Award

References

External links
 Official website

1999 establishments in the United Arab Emirates
Clubs and societies in the United Arab Emirates
Journalism organizations
Mass media in Dubai
Press clubs